The 2013–14 Furman Paladins men's basketball team represented Furman University during the 2013–14 NCAA Division I men's basketball season. The Paladins, led by first year head coach Niko Medved, played their home games at Timmons Arena and were members of the Southern Conference. They finished the season 9–21, 3–13 in SoCon play to finish in tenth place. They lost in the first round of the SoCon tournament to Georgia Southern.

Roster

Schedule

|-
!colspan=9 style="background:#6B3FA0; color:#FFFFFF;"| Exhibition

|-
!colspan=9 style="background:#6B3FA0; color:#FFFFFF;"| Regular season

|-
!colspan=9 style="background:#6B3FA0; color:#FFFFFF;"| 2014 SoCon tournament

References

Furman Paladins men's basketball seasons
Furman
Furm
Furm